Mauna Loa is a volcano in Hawaii.

Mauna Loa may also refer to:

Mauna Loa Observatory, an observatory on the slopes of that volcano
Mauna Loa Solar Observatory, another observatory on that volcano
Mauna Loa Macadamia Nut Corporation, a Hawaiian business
Maunaloa, Hawaii, a community on the Hawaiian island of Moloka'i
SS Mauna Loa, a steam-powered cargo ship
USS Mauna Loa, the name of more than one United States Navy ship
West Molokai Volcano, an extinct volcano sometimes called Mauna Loa